Ahl is a surname. Notable people with the surname include:

David H. Ahl (born 1939), American writer
Ernst Ahl (1898–1945), German zoologist
Frederick Ahl (born 1941), American academic and classical scholar
John Alexander Ahl (1813–1882), American railroad executive and politician
Kennet Ahl, pseudonym of Swedish crime novelist duo Lasse Strömstedt and Christer Dahl